Northampton is a civil parish in Carleton County, New Brunswick, Canada, sitting across the Saint John River from Woodstock. It comprises two local service districts, both of which are members of the Western Valley Regional Service Commission (WVRSC).

The Census subdivision of Northampton Parish shares the civil parish's borders.

Origin of name
The parish's name may have come from it being on what was then the northern edge of York County.

History
Northampton was erected in 1786 as one of York County's original parishes. It originally included most of Southampton Parish and modern Northampton Parish.

Boundaries
Northampton Parish is roughly triangular in shape, bounded:

 on the west by the Saint John River;
 on the southeast by York County;
 on the north by a line beginning north of Shaws Creek and running southeast nearly to the southern line of the grant that includes the mouth of Shaws Creek, easterly to the boundary of the Becaguimec Game Management Area, then due east to the county line.

Evolution of boundaries
The wording of the northeastern boundary proved problematic, describing an endpoint in a stretch of shoreline with no waterway large enough to be named on modern provincial maps. If the Pine Island named is actually the next island downriver of modern Pine Island (Sharps Island, formerly Indian Island) then Shaws Creek is in the right place to be the river where the northeastern line ended.

In 1832 Carleton County was separated from York County. The county line ran through Northampton to the east of the modern line, with more of the parish on the York side than the Carleton side.

In 1833 the York County portion of Northampton was erected as Southampton Parish.

In 1834 the county line was moved west about 600 metres to run along grant lines at the shore, transferring a strip of territory to Southampton.

In 1841 the vagueness of the northern boundary had caused sufficient difficulty with property assessments that the boundary with Brighton Parish was set as a line running due east from Shaws Creek. This transferred the northeastern part of modern Northampton from Brighton.

In 1862 the boundary with Brighton Parish was moved north from the mouth of Shaws Creek to its current course. Wording changes in 1896 and 1952 clarified the boundary but did not alter it.

Local service districts
Both LSDs assess for community & recreation services and the basic LSD services of fire protection, police services, land use planning, emergency measures, and dog control.

Northampton Parish
The local service district of the parish of Northampton originally comprised the entire parish; it now includes only the northern river grants and the interior of the parish.

The parish LSD was established in 1966 to assess for fire protection after the abolition of county government under the new Municipalities Act. Community services were added in 1967 and recreational and sports facilities in 2011.

The taxing authority is 210.00 Northampton.

LSD advisory committee: Yes. Chair Graham Gill sits on the board of the WVRSC.

Upper and Lower Northampton
Upper and Lower Northampton comprises the Saint John River grants from the southern intersection of Route 105 and Parker Road.

The LSD was established in 1987 to add first aid & ambulance services and recreational facilities.

The taxing authority is 231.00 Upper & Lower Northampton.

LSD advisory committee: Yes. Chair Ed Stone has sat on the WVRSC board since at least 2015. Stone was listed as the Chair of Northampton in 2015 and 2016 and as an alternate LSD board member in 2017 and 2018.

Communities
Communities at least partly within the parish.

 Carr
 East Newbridge
  Grafton
 Grafton Hill
 Harten Corner
 Kilmarnock
 Lower Northampton
 Newbridge
 Newburg
 Newburg Junction
  Northampton
  Pembroke
 Upper Northampton

Bodies of water
Bodies of water at least partly within the parish.

  Saint John River
 Nackawic Stream
 Gibson Creek
 Phillips Creek
 Shaws Creek
 Ayers Lake

Islands
Islands at least partly within the parish.
 Riordan Islets

Other notable places
Parks, historic sites, and other noteworthy places at least partly within the parish.
 Angle Hill Lake Protected Natural Area
 Becaguimec Wildlife Management Area
 Woodstock Aerodrome

Demographics

Population
Population trend

Language
Mother tongue (2016)

See also
List of parishes in New Brunswick

Notes

References

Parishes of Carleton County, New Brunswick